Dodgeville is an unincorporated community, in Des Moines County, Iowa, United States.

History
 Founded in the 1800s, Dodgeville's population was just 17 in 1902, but had increased to 115 by 1925.

Notable person
William F. Kopp, Iowa politician, was born on a farm near Dodgeville.

Notes

Unincorporated communities in Des Moines County, Iowa
Unincorporated communities in Iowa